Linus Yale (27 April 1797 – 8 August 1858) was an American inventor, manufacturer of Bank locks, and 1st Mayor of Newport, New York. His son, Linus Yale Jr, would found the Premier manufacturer of locks in the United States.

Biography

Yale was born in Middletown, Connecticut, and later moved with his parents to Salisbury, New York. He married Chlotilda Hopson, 27 September 1815, and they had four children. His brothers were Burrage Buchanan Yale and Allen Yale, the cofounders of Lamson, Goodnow & Yale company, a gun-making machine manufacturer based in Windsor, Vermont and Shelburne Falls, Massachusetts. Their company was behind the majority of the weapons manufactured to the Union Army of Abraham Lincoln during the American Civil War, and supplied companies such as the U.S. government, U.K. government, Springfield Armory, Colt's Manufacturing Company, Remington Arms, Amoskeag Manufacturing Company, and many others.

They were also one of the largest cutlery manufacturers in the U.S during that war, and supplied bayonets and muskets to previous wars, such as the American Revolutionary War, the Mexican-American War and the Crimean War of Napoleon III. Around 1858, they acquired the bankrupt Robbins and Lawrence Armory with Eli Whitney and Samuel Colt, a long time associate, and produced weapons such as the Springfield Model 1861. Parts were interchangeable with these weapons and with the Colt musket parts. They had received a special government contract from the Lincoln administration for this model, and was accepted by the Senate, under the personal request of Secretary of War Simon Cameron and Edwin Stanton, and with the approval of Joseph Holt, Robert Dale Owen, Peter V. Hagner, and General James Wolfe Ripley.

LG & Yale was one of the companies that shaped the American Civil War itself, as they produced gun-making machinery to supply most of the factories making rifles, carbines, and pistols for the Union Army. Mr. Lamson, fervant abolitionist and head of the company, was one of the ten historical representative American manufacturers of the Civil War period. His home was a station on the underground railroad, hosting many African Americans at his table on their way to Canada.

An exhibition named "Arming the Union" can be seen at the American Precision Museum, where the factory of Lamson, Goodnow & Yale was located.

In 1857 the village of Newport, New York, was incorporated and Linus Yale was elected its first President and Mayor. Yale opened a lock shop in the early 1840s in the village of Newport, New York, specializing in bank locks for bank vaults. In 1850 his son, Linus Yale Jr. joined him at the lock shop and began working on improving his father's pin tumbler lock. Linus Yale Jr. would later found the Yale Lock Company with Henry R. Towne, which would end up becoming the premier lock manufacturer in the United States. They would later add the manufacturing of chain blocks, electric hoists, cranes and testing machines, and become the pioneer of crane builder. 

Through his career as an inventor, Linus Yale Sr. registered 14 patents under his name at the United States Patent and Trademark Office, and were signed by the President of the United States Andrew Jackson. 

These patents included innovations about a threshing machine, sawmill head block, combination lock, pin tumbler safe lock, bank lock, vault and safe door bolt, among others.

The innovations made in the gun-making industry were useful for the door lock industry, as gun locks and door locks were similar in design. After the civil war, the factories stopped manufacturing weapons and started using their capacities to manufacture others products such as sewing machines, bicycles, factory-canned foods, home appliances, and automobiles. The knowledge gained through the war effort was thus very useful for the Yale Lock Company as each part of the lock system was designed to allow its manufacture with machine tools, just like the concept of the precise-machine tools of interchangeable parts used by his brother Allen Yale at LG & Yale during the war.

Family

Around 1850, Linus Sr. built an octagon house for the marriage of his daughter, Chlothilda to Ira L. Cady. The building is now listed on the National register of Historic Places.

Just as his son, Linus Yale Jr., his grandchildren would be part of the industrial revolution as well. 

Catherine Brooks, Linus Yale Jr.'s wife, was born in into an elite family. She was the daughter of John Brooks, a doctor and member of the Legislature. His grandson was the Governor of Wyoming Bryant Butler Brooks, and his cousin was the Bishop of Massachusetts Phillips Brooks. Catherine's favorite teacher was the famous Ralph Waldo Emerson, who was from Massachusetts as well. Her sister, Jean Brooks Greenleaf, was also married to Congressman Halbert S. Greenleaf, and was elected President of the New York State Women's Suffrage Association.

Madeline Yale Wynne became an artist and philanthropist. She married Senator Henry Winn, son of Senator Reuben Winn, and studied at the Art Students League of New York.

John Brooks Yale joined the Union League of New York, and married to Marie Louise McCulloch, daughter of U.S. Secretary of the Treasury Hugh McCulloch, who played a central role in financing  the American Civil War under Abraham Lincoln. John became Treasurer of the Yale Lock Company, and helped Henry R. Towne scaling the enterprise into a global company, with 12 000 workers and their products sold in more than 120 countries. He also became the Representative of the Illinois Steel Company from N.Y. in the Empire Building. The company was the largest steel producer in the United States and they later acquired Carnegie Steel with J.P. Morgan.

Julian L. Yale (1848-1909) became the owner and President of Julian L. Yale & Co., a Railway supply business operating from the Railway Exchange Building in Chicago. He introduced the Shelby Steel Tube to the railway market.  His notable customers were Carnegie Steel, Illinois Steel, Lackawanna Steel, etc. He also became a member of the Union League Club of New York, the Union League Club of Chicago, the Chicago Club, the Chicago Athletic Association, the Cliff Dwellers Club, the Union Club, and the St. Louis Club. 

Another member of his family was William Henry Yale (born 1859), dry goods merchant, owner of Townsend & Yale, one of the oldest and largest commission house in the U.S., with offices on Fifth Avenue, New York, Boston, Chicago, and Philadelphia. The firm was the sole agent of the Boston Manufacturing Company, one of the very first factories in America. William Henry Yale was a Yale graduate, and a member of the Yale Club, Sons of the American Revolution, and the Union League Club of New York. His father, Henry Clay Yale (1829-1897), was also a member of the Union League Club of New York.

Patents

Patents by Linus Yale Sr. from the United States Patent and Trademark Office, signed by the President of the United States, Andrew Jackson:

 20 Jan. 1830  mill stone dresser — Salisbury, New York
 17 Sept. 1833  horse power — Otsego, New York (with P.C. Curtis)
 17 Sept. 1833  threshing machine — Utica, New York (with P.C. Curtis)
 11 Sept. 1835  sawmill head block — Utica, New York
 17 May 1838  grain threshing machine — Little Falls, New York (with S.W. Stimson)
 29 July 1841  sawmill dog — Newport, New York
 20 Oct. 1843  combination lock — Springfield, Massachusetts (with C. Wilson)
 13 June 1844  pin tumbler safe lock — Springfield, Massachusetts
 13 Feb. 1849  safe — Newport, New York
 18 Oct. 1853  a bank lock — Newport, New York
 28 Feb. 1854 a bank lock — Newport, New York
 22 May 1855  a bank lock — Newport, New York
 5 Aug. 1856  vault and safe door bolt — Newport, New York
 8 Sept. 1857  padlock — Newport, New York

References

Sources
 Yale, Elihu. The Yale Family. New Haven, Connecticut: Storer & Storer, 1850. LCCN: 09-18747
 Yale, Rodney Horace. Yale Genealogy and History of Wales.  Beatrice, Nebraska: Milburn and Scott Co., 1908. LCCN: 09-9945

See also
Linus Yale Jr.
Yale-Cady Octagon House and Yale Lock Factory Site
Yale (company)

1797 births
1858 deaths
19th-century American inventors
Locksmiths
People from Middletown, Connecticut
People from Newport, New York